Macromphalina apexplanum is a species of very small sea snail, a marine gastropod mollusk in the family Vanikoridae.

Distribution
The organism is distributed across the Western Atlantic and can be found in Panama, Colombia, Antigua; and Trinidad & Tobago.

Description 
The maximum recorded shell length is 1.5 mm.

Habitat 
The minimum recorded depth is 10 m; the maximum recorded depth is 25 m.

References

Vanikoridae
Gastropods described in 1998